John William R. Hodgson (28 September 1900 – 3 January 1959) was an English professional football full back who appeared in the Football League for Brentford.

Career statistics

References

1900 births
1959 deaths
Footballers from County Durham
Association football fullbacks
English footballers
Darlington Town F.C. players
Sunderland A.F.C. players
Brentford F.C. players
Hartlepool United F.C. players
English Football League players
Canadian National Soccer League players
English expatriate sportspeople in Canada
English expatriate footballers
Expatriate soccer players in Canada